Fouhren is a small town in the commune of Tandel, in north-eastern Luxembourg.  , the town has a population of 353.

Fouhren was a commune in the canton of Vianden until 1 January 2006, when it was merged with the commune of Bastendorf to form the new commune of Tandel.  The law creating Tandel was passed on 21 December 2004.

Villages
The former commune consisted of the villages:

 Bettel
 Fouhren
 Longsdorf
 Walsdorf
 Seltz
 Bleesbréck (lieu-dit)
 Marxberg (lieu-dit)
 Schmëttenhaff (lieu-dit)

References

Tandel
Former communes of Luxembourg
Towns in Luxembourg